Psittirostrini is a formerly-recognized tribe of Hawaiian honeycreepers. It was used for the finch-like honeycreepers that once inhabited all of the Hawaiian Islands. These birds are granivorous and have songs like those of non-Hawaiian cardueline finches.  The only definitely extant species are the Laysan finch, the Nihoa finch, the Maui parrotbill, and the palila. Extinct species include the koa finches, the ʻōʻū, and the Lanaʻi hookbill.

Genera and species

Genus Chloridops Wilson, 1888 - thick-billed, hard seed (e.g. Myoporum sandwicense) specialist
Chloridops kona Wilson, 1888 - Kona grosbeak (extinct, 1894)
 Chloridops regiskongi - King Kong grosbeak (prehistoric)
 Chloridops wahi - wahi grosbeak (prehistoric)
Genus Dysmorodrepanis Perkins, 1919 - pincer-like bill, possibly snail specialist
Dysmorodrepanis munroi Perkins, 1919 - Lanaʻi hookbill (extinct, 1918)
 Genus Loxioides Oustalet, 1877 - finch-like, Fabales seed specialists
Loxioides bailleui Oustalet, 1877 - palila
 Loxioides kikuichi Olson & James, 2006 - Kaua'i palila (prehistoric, possibly survived to the early 18th century)
 Genus Orthiospiza -  large weak bill, possibly soft seed or fruit specialist?
Orthiospiza howarthi James & Olson, 1991 - highland finch (prehistoric)
 Genus Pseudonestor -  parrot-like bill, probes wood for insect larvae
Pseudonestor xanthophrys Rothschild, 1893 - Maui parrotbill or kiwikiu
 Genus Psittirostra - slightly hooked bill, Freycinetia arborea fruit specialist
Psittirostra psittacea Gmelin, 1789 - ʻōʻū (probably extinct, 1998?)
 Genus Rhodacanthis - large-billed, granivorous, legume specialists 
Rhodacanthis flaviceps Rothschild, 1892 - lesser koa-finch (extinct, 1891)
 Rhodacanthis forfex James & Olson, 2005 - scissor-billed koa-finch (prehistoric)
 Rhodacanthis litotes James & Olson, 2005 - primitive koa-finch (prehistoric)
 Rhodacanthis palmeri Rothschild, 1892 - greater koa-finch (extinct, 1896)
 Genus Telespiza Wilson, 1890 - finch-like, granivorous, opportunistic scavengers
Telespiza cantans Wilson, 1890 - Laysan finch
 Telespiza persecutrix James & Olson, 1991 - Kauaʻi finch (prehistoric)
 Telespiza ultima Bryan, 1917 - Nihoa finch
 Telespiza ypsilon James & Olson, 1991 - Maui Nui finch (prehistoric)
 Genus Xestospiza James & Oslon, 1991 - cone-shaped bills, possibly insectivorous
Xestospiza conica James & Olson, 1991 - cone-billed finch (prehistoric)
 Xestospiza fastigialis James & Olson, 1991 - ridge-billed finch (prehistoric)

References 

Bird tribes
Carduelinae
Endemic fauna of Hawaii
Higher-level bird taxa restricted to the Australasia-Pacific region